Division No. 12 is a census division in Alberta, Canada. Including the City of Cold Lake, the majority of the division is located in the northeast corner of central Alberta. The northern portion of the division is located within northern Alberta.

Census subdivisions 
The following census subdivisions (municipalities or municipal equivalents) are located within Alberta's Division No. 12.

Cities
Cold Lake
Towns
Bonnyville
Elk Point
Smoky Lake
St. Paul
Villages
Glendon
Vilna
Waskatenau
Summer villages
Bonnyville Beach
Horseshoe Bay
Pelican Narrows
Municipal districts
Bonnyville No. 87, M.D. of
Lac La Biche County
Smoky Lake County
St. Paul No. 19, County of
Indian reserves
Beaver Lake 131   
Cold Lake 149
Cold Lake 149A
Cold Lake 149B
Heart Lake 167  
Kehewin 123  
Puskiakiwenin 122  
Saddle Lake 125  
Unipouheos 121  
White Fish Lake 128

Demographics 

See also 
List of census divisions of Alberta
List of communities in Alberta

References 

Census divisions of Alberta